Timeline is the fifth compilation album released by Richard Marx shortly after the release of Days in Avalon. It includes some of Marx's popular songs including a medley of all of Marx's singles at the time of this album's release.

Track listing
 "Days In Avalon" (Marx) 4:54
 "Don't Mean Nothing" (Marx/Bruce Gaitsch) 4:38
 "Should've Known Better" (Marx) 4:07
 "Endless Summer Nights" (Marx) 4:27
 "Hold On To The Nights" (Marx) 5:07
 "Satisfied" (Marx) 4:14
 "Right Here Waiting" (Marx) 4:24
 "Angelia" (Marx) 5:17
 "Hazard" (Marx) 5:17
 "Now And Forever" (Marx) 3:32
 "Until I Find You Again" (Marx) 4:24
 "Days In Avalon" (Marx) 4:54
 "Hits Medley" 6:08

Miscellaneous
The track Angelia is incorrectly listed as "Angela."

Richard Marx albums
Albums produced by Richard Marx
2000 compilation albums